Thomas Chay Beale (13 December 1805 – 3 November 1857) was a Scottish merchant and diplomat operating in the Far East during the 19th century. He was a Chevalier of the Legion of Honor and of the Portuguese Order of Christ.

Biography
Chay Beale was a nephew of opium trader and merchant Daniel Beale and his brother Thomas Beale. As early as 1826, he was a partner in the trading firm of Magniac & Co. in Canton, China. In the 1830s he left Magniacs and operated on his own until 1845 when he established the Shanghai based agency house of Dent, Beale & Co. with Lancelot Dent. By 1851, Beale was Portuguese Consul and Dutch Vice Counsel in the city.

He is buried in the Shantung Road Cemetery in Shanghai and there is a memorial to him in the church of St. Mary the Virgin in Brettenham, Suffolk.

References

External links

1805 births
1857 deaths
History of foreign trade in China
Chevaliers of the Légion d'honneur
British expatriates in China
19th-century Scottish businesspeople